Kelvin Wade Kisio (born September 18, 1959) is a Canadian former professional ice hockey player who currently serves as a scout for the Vegas Golden Knights of the National Hockey League (NHL). Kisio played 761 games in the NHL as a centre for the Detroit Red Wings, New York Rangers, San Jose Sharks, and Calgary Flames between 1983 and 1995, and was team captain for the Rangers for three and a half years.

Career
Kisio played junior hockey with the Alberta Junior Hockey League's Red Deer Rustlers and Western Hockey League's Calgary Wranglers, producing consecutive 60 goal seasons for the latter.

He played the 1982–83 season with HC Davos in Switzerland. He scored 49 goals and 32 assists. Although Davos was leading the season for more than 20 games, they ended in third place. In his next-to-last game for HC Davos, Kisio scored eight goals and two assists. The game's final score was 19–7. Kisio left three days later for the Detroit Red Wings where he became a valuable player in the NHL.

Kisio's best season in the NHL was in 1992–93 with the San Jose Sharks. That season he tied a career high in goals (26) and points (78) and represented the Sharks in the 1993 NHL All-Star Game in Montreal after Pat Falloon went down with a season-ending shoulder injury.

Kisio ended his playing career with the Calgary Flames in 1995, who were ousted by his former team, San Jose in the playoffs.  He then joined the Flames' scouting staff. For the 1998–99 season, he was named general manager of the Calgary Hitmen, who are owned by the Flames. With Kisio as GM, the Hitmen made the playoffs every year but one (2010–11), won four regular season titles, and won the Western Hockey League title in both 1999 and 2010.

Family
Kisio and his wife Linda have three children: Brent, Kurtis, and Kristina. Brent (born December 15, 1982) is the head coach of the Lethbridge Hurricanes of the Western Hockey League, and Kurtis (born June 30, 1984) played 59 games with the Austin Ice Bats of the Central Hockey League during the 2007–08 season.

Awards

 1979  WHL Rookie of the Year, with the Calgary Wranglers
 1990  Steven McDonald Extra Effort Award (shared with John Vanbiesbrouck)
 1993  NHL All-Star
 2004  Lloyd Saunders Memorial Trophy, top WHL executive

Legacy

In the 2009 book 100 Ranger Greats, the authors ranked Kisio at No. 80 all-time of the 901 New York Rangers who had played during the team's first 82 seasons.

Career statistics

Regular season and playoffs

References

External links

 NHL alumni biography

1959 births
Living people
Adirondack Red Wings players
Calgary Flames players
Calgary Flames scouts
Calgary Hitmen coaches
Calgary Wranglers (WHL) players
Canadian expatriate ice hockey players in Switzerland
Canadian ice hockey centres
Canadian ice hockey coaches
Dallas Black Hawks players
Detroit Red Wings players
HC Davos players
Ice hockey people from Alberta
Kalamazoo Wings (1974–2000) players
National Hockey League All-Stars
New York Rangers players
Red Deer Rustlers players
San Jose Sharks players
Undrafted National Hockey League players
Vegas Golden Knights scouts